Levi Higginson (born 1867; date of death unknown) was a footballer who played as a goalkeeper for Burslem Port Vale in the early 1890s.

Career
Higginson most probably joined Burslem Port Vale in 1890. He enjoyed a successful spell with the team and was between the sticks for two cup final victories – the North Staffordshire Charity Challenge Cup in 1891 and the Staffordshire Charity Cup in 1892. He played 43 matches for the club in all; including 21 friendlies, one Football League Second Division and 17 Midland League matches. However, he failed to turn up at the Athletic Ground for a league match with Grimsby Town in February 1893, after conceding two goals to them the previous month. He was not selected again and was instead released at the end of 1892–93 season.

Career statistics
Source:

Honours
Port Vale
North Staffordshire Charity Challenge Cup: 1891
Staffordshire Charity Cup: 1892

References

1867 births
Year of death missing
People from Wolstanton
English footballers
Association football goalkeepers
Port Vale F.C. players
Midland Football League players
English Football League players